HJA may refer to:
 
 Air Haïti
 Hodge Jones & Allen
 Honolulu Junior Academy, now the Academy of the Pacific